Rebel Coast Winery is a winery in Hermosa Beach, California.

Rebel Coast was started in 2013 by Kate Seiberlich, Doug Burkett, and Chip Forsythe (an alumnus of California Polytechnic State University). Rebel Coast makes a red wine called Reckless Love, a white wine called Sunday Funday and another red called Lost by Choice.

In late 2017, Rebel Coast announced the release of a THC-infused Sauvignon Blanc.  The plan was to ship the wine only to customers in US states where recreational use of marijuana was legal.

References

Wineries in California
American companies established in 2013
Food and drink companies established in 2013
2013 establishments in California